Limomyza is a genus of flies belonging to the family Lesser Dung flies.

Species
L. archiptera Marshall, 1997
L. brevifrons (Duda, 1925)
L. cavernicola Marshall, 1997
L. hirta Marshall, 1997
L. sharkeyi Marshall, 1997
L. venia Marshall, 1997

References

Sphaeroceridae
Diptera of South America
Brachycera genera